The Adelaide Timber Company was  a family saw mill company that had timber mills and timber railway lines across a number of locations in Australia in the late nineteenth and early twentieth century.

The businesses were established in South Australia, Western Australia, and Victoria as part of the Shepherdson family business.

Mills 
 Mount Barker, South Australia (1850 - 1860 ?)
 Springhill, Victoria (Australia) (1862 - 1877 ?)
 Adelaide, South Australia (hills to east) (1878 - 1894 ?)
 Gugeri's Siding on Mundaring Weir railway line (1895 - 1900s  ?)
 Greenbushes, Western Australia (1899 -1909)
 Wilga, Western Australia  (1908-1984)
 East Witchcliffe (1929)

Notes

History of South Australia
Economic history of Western Australia
Defunct railway companies of Australia
Timber companies of Western Australia
Defunct forest products companies of Australia
Australian companies established in 1850